Colotis mananhari is a butterfly in the family Pieridae. It is found on Madagascar. The habitat consists of unnatural grassland and anthropogenic environments.

References

Butterflies described in 1870
mananhari
Butterflies of Africa